Campbell Banks (born 23 November 1978) is a footballer. He has represented New Zealand at international level.

Club career
Banks played for Nelson Suburbs, Miramar Rangers and Central United in the National League before joining the Football Kingz in the Australian NSL. He was released by the Kingz and returned to the National League, but later rejoined their reincarnation, New Zealand Knights FC, making two appearances in 2006 He was released by New Zealand Knights FC in 2006 and joined Green Gully Cavaliers. He played for Sunshine George Cross in the Victorian Premier League in Australia during the 09–10 season before returning to New Zealand. There, he played for YoungHeart Manawatu in the ASB Premiership, along with Wairarapa United during the winter season.

International career
Banks scored on his full All Whites debut in a 2–1 win over Malaysia on 23 February 2006 making two further appearances in that series.

References

External links

 Butterfield, Banks have x-factor that could decide final 

1978 births
Living people
Expatriate soccer players in Australia
Football Kingz F.C. players
A-League Men players
National Soccer League (Australia) players
Association football forwards
New Zealand expatriate association footballers
New Zealand expatriate sportspeople in Australia
New Zealand international footballers
New Zealand Knights FC players
New Zealand association footballers
Caroline Springs George Cross FC players
Nelson Suburbs players